Contemporary Art Centre (CAC) – art institution, established in 1992 by Lithuanian Ministry of Culture. CAC has replaced the Arts Exhibition Palace and took over its building in Vilnius, 2 Vokiečių street. CAC contains five exposition rooms (total area exceeds 2000 sq. m) and a cinema hall. In 1997 FLUXUS cabinet of George Maciunas was opened, housing a permanent exhibition of fluxus artworks, assembled from private collection of Gilbert and Lila Silverman. Since 2005 CAC the periodic journal "ŠMC/CAC Interviu" is issued by CAC.

Links

References 

Art museums and galleries in Lithuania
Museums in Vilnius